Autechre is an English electronic music duo consisting of Rob Brown and Sean Booth, both from Rochdale, Greater Manchester. Formed in 1987, they are among the best known and influential acts signed to UK electronic label Warp Records, through which all of Autechre's full-length albums have been released beginning with their 1993 debut Incunabula. They gained initial recognition when they were featured on Warp's 1992 compilation Artificial Intelligence.

Influenced by styles such as 1980s electro and hip hop, the music of Autechre has evolved throughout their career from early, melodic techno recordings to later works often considered abstract and experimental, featuring complex composition and few stylistic conventions. Their work has been associated with the 1990s electronic genre known as intelligent dance music (IDM), though Booth has dismissed the label as "silly."

History

Early years (1987–1992)
Brown and Booth met through Manchester's graffiti scene in 1987 when they both lived in Rochdale. Heavily influenced by electro-funk, hip-hop, and acid house, they began trading mixtapes and then creating their own compositions while collecting a handful of cheap equipment, most notably a Casio SK-1 sampler and a Roland TR-606 drum machine. Their first release was Lego Feet, a 12" recorded under an alias of the same name brought out by Manchester's Skam Records.

Their first release as Autechre was the single "Cavity Job" in 1991, released on Hardcore Records. Booth and Brown pronounce the name Autechre with a Rochdale accent. However, they have explained that the name can be pronounced in any way one sees fit. Booth said: "The first two letters were intentional, because there was an 'au' sound in the track, and the rest of the letters were bashed randomly on the keyboard. We had this track title for ages, and we had written it on a cassette, with some graphics. It looked good, and we began using it as our name."

Two more tracks appeared in 1992 under the now finalised Autechre name, on the Warp Records compilation Artificial Intelligence, part of the series of the same name. The compilation contained "The Egg", later reworked for their first full-length release under the title "Eggshell".

Two hours of early material was broadcast live on NTS Radio during Warp's 30th anniversary weekend, called Warp Tapes 89-93. It is distributed for free on Autechre's Bleep Store in digital audio format.

Incunabula and Amber (1993–1994)
In 1993 Warp released their debut album, Incunabula, which became a surprise success, reaching the top of the UK Indie Chart. The album had a cool, calculated feel, with clear techno and electro roots, but also showed hints of the rhythmic flourishes and tuned percussion that would later become an important feature of their work. An EP of remixes of Incunabula's "Basscadet" was released in 1994, with animated computer graphics for the Bcdtmx version created by Jess Scott-Hunter. This music video featured on MTV Europe's Party Zone when Autechre were interviewed during the show in September that year. 1994 also saw the release of Amber, an album featuring a more ambient, less percussive approach than their debut.

The Anti EP was released shortly before Amber and is, as of yet, the only Autechre release to have an explicit purpose: it was a protest against the Criminal Justice and Public Order Act 1994, which would prohibit raves, defined as any gathering of nine or more people where rave music is played. Rave music was defined as music which "includes sounds wholly or predominantly characterized by the emission of a succession of repetitive beats". The record came wrapped in a seal, on which was printed a legal warning: "Flutter has been programmed in such a way that no bars contain identical beats and can therefore be played at both forty five and thirty three revolutions under the proposed new law. However we advise DJs to have a lawyer and musicologist present at all times to confirm the non repetitive nature of the music in the event of police harassment."

In a 2008 interview with Pitchfork Media, Rob Brown mentioned that Incunabula and Amber retrospectively sounded "cheesy". Brown later clarified that "they were perhaps more simple, but not in a shit way."

Tri Repetae, Chiastic Slide, and LP5 (1995–1999)

1995 saw the release of Tri Repetae, their third album, as well as the EPs Anvil Vapre and Garbage, featuring a monochrome cover designed by The Designers Republic, with whom Autechre have long held a close association. Tri Repetae and its associated EPs were combined into a two disc set entitled Tri Repetae++, which was released in the United States. An official promotional video was created for "Second Bad Vilbel" from Anvil Vapre by English visual artist Chris Cunningham (his first). The "Second Bad Vilbel" video featured rapidly cut shots of industrial machinery and robotic movement, synchronised with the music. Cunningham later re-edited the video in 2002, following his disappointment with the original: "It was intended to be completely abstract but it didn't quite work out that way". A two track vinyl-only EP entitled We R Are Why, was available to buy during certain concerts and via mail order during 1996. Also in 1995, Autechre's track "Nonima" was featured on Mind The Gap Volume 5, a Belgian compilation of electronic music.

Autechre released three records in 1997: the full length Chiastic Slide, and the EPs Envane, and Cichlisuite (pronounced "sickly sweet"). The latter EP consists of five remixed versions of "Cichli" from Chiastic Slide. Radio Mix was also released in 1997; a rare CD-only promotional recording, it contains an hour-long DJ mix of other artists' tracks, some of them remixed by Autechre, as well as a short interview edited sometimes to the point of incomprehensibility.

An untitled record (typically known as LP5 or simply Autechre) followed in 1998. It has been seen as a transitional work, with Brown commenting in 2005 that "a lot of people have cited it as a classic Autechre album because it bridges the gap between the guys who liked our old stuff and the guys who got propelled on to our new stuff."

1999 saw the release of their first Peel session EP, consisting of three tracks broadcast on John Peel's show for BBC Radio 1 in October 1995, as well as a vinyl-only limited edition promotional EP entitled Splitrmx12. 1999 also saw EP7, which is classed by the group as an EP despite being over an hour in length.

Confield, Draft 7.30, and Untilted (2000–2007)

The new millennium brought about a drastic change in Autechre's style, demonstrated by Confield (2001) and Draft 7.30 (2003), as well as the Gantz Graf EP (2002). The title track from Gantz Graf inspired an iconic video by British designer Alex Rutterford, featuring an object (or an agglomeration of objects) synchronised to the music as it morphs, pulsates, shakes, and finally dissolves. Rutterford, who had previously created an unofficial video for the Tri Repetae track "Eutow" as part of the Channel 4 music programme Lo-Fi in 2001, claimed the idea for the "Gantz Graf" video came during one of his LSD trips. The second Autechre Peel session EP was also released in 2002, containing four tracks broadcast in 1999, named by John Peel himself. Autechre released three collaborative albums with Andrew M. McKenzie's Hafler Trio collective during the following five years (see collaborations).

Metacritic rated the critical reviews to Confield as "universal acclaim". According to Sean Booth, "most of Confield came out of experiments with Max that weren't really applicable in a club environment." In contrast, 2003's Draft 7.30 was seen by some as an easier record to grasp. Booth stated in an interview around the release of Draft 7.30 that "[rhythm] doesn't seem to limit us in the way it did when we first started. Now I think we just get it, we're totally fluent in it and can be more expressive."Untilted (a play on the word "untitled"), the duo's eighth album, was released in 2005. It roughly continued the sound of their previous two LPs, though featured compositions that mutated greatly during their duration, typically alternating between passages of ambience and heavily processed, precise beats, such as on "Ipacial Section". Its final track, "Sublimit", is at almost sixteen minutes; Autechre's longest composition to feature on any of their albums until 2016's elseq 1-5. The release of Untilted was followed by a two-month tour that took the group around Europe, America and Japan, but withdrew them from studio work for an unusual length of time. The outcome of this, coupled with a forced change in studio setup, was a gap of three years between releases, longer than ever before.

Quaristice, Oversteps, and Exai (2008–2013)
Their ninth album, Quaristice, was released in early 2008. In contrast to Untilted, it is made up of twenty tracks, more than any other Autechre release, each typically around 2–5 minutes in length. The download-only Quaristice.Quadrange.ep.ae EP that accompanies it (as well as the Versions bonus disc and three tracks released exclusively through the Japanese iTunes Store) brings the total length of music released during their Quaristice era to over five hours. Among this is the hour-long "Perlence subrange 6-36" that closes the EP. Each track on Quaristice was edited down from lengthy improvised sessions between Booth and Brown, some of which were released in longer versions on Quaristice. Quadrange.ep.ae. Although Sean Booth has stated that the FLAC release of Quaristice is the actual product, the album was also released by Warp Records as a double LP and a single CD as well as an elaborate two CD edition by Warp Records. Limited to only 1000 copies, and containing both the regular album and Quaristice (Versions), this special edition was packaged in a photo-etched steel case. It sold out within 12 hours of being announced.

On 13 January 2010, Warp Records announced Oversteps, Autechre's tenth album. Originally slated to be released in March, it was released a month early in digital form on Bleep.com to those who preordered it; the CD and deluxe vinyl editions were released on 22 March 2010. A two-month European tour occurred in support of the album, followed by limited shows in Japan and Australia, the latter breaking a 15-year absence. Autechre then compiled a mix for the magazine FACT, released in February of the same year, that consisted of tracks by artists such as J Dilla and Necrophagist. On 25 May 2010, Warp Records announced the ten track Move of Ten, an EP by the duo in conjunction with the release of Oversteps. The digipack CD and the two 12" vinyl version, as well as a digital download, was released on 12 July 2010.

In April 2011 a boxset of EPs entitled EPs 1991 – 2002 (excluding Move of Ten) was released, with artwork from the Designers Republic. It includes a CD copy of their debut EP, Cavity Job, the first time it has been released on the format. In 2011 as part of Warp's 'Made in Japan' relief concert for the victims of the 2011 Sendai earthquake, an eleven-minute piece was released entitled '6852', possibly part of a previous live recording.

The eleventh studio album entitled Exai was released on 5 March 2013, having been available for download from the official website as of Valentine's Day, 14 February 2013. The duo announced their 14th EP L-Event on 17 September 2013, which was released on 28 October 2013.

AENA tour, AE_LIVE, elseq 1–5, NTS Sessions (2014–2019)
During 2015, the duo embarked on a tour across North America, marketed as AENA. The tour was officially announced on the Warp Records website on 25 May 2015 but promotional material (specifically the logos for the upcoming tour) can be found that was released on 13 August 2014. On 29 October 2015 members of the Autechre mailing list were given invite-only permission to download a live recording from the duo titled , a collection of 4 hour-long soundboard recordings of a series of concerts that took place in 2014. On 1 November 2015 a Bleep.com substore opened up giving the public the ability to purchase and download the collection.

On 13 May 2016 a new Autechre track by the title of "feed1" was played on Tom Ravenscroft's late evening show on BBC 6 Music after an announcement made on the Warp Records Twitter feed which was accompanied by a piece of geometric album art. On 18 May 2016 a second new track was played on KSUA, an Alaskan student radio station, again announced in a tweet by Warp. Afterwards, Warp released the snippet of the Autechre song on their soundcloud under the title "c16 deep tread". On 19 May 2016, their twelfth studio album, elseq 1-5, on Autechre's AE_STORE_ page. Warp Records have stated that there are no plans to release the album on a physical medium, making the album Autechre's first digital-only studio album release.

On 6 April 2018, a livestream of new material was broadcast on NTS Radio, marking the first of four live streams released every week of the month. On 9 April 2018, it was unveiled that the sessions, totalling eight hours of material, would be packaged and released as NTS Sessions 1–4 with a listing on the AE_STORE, including 12xLP and 8xCD boxsets. The livestreams coincided with the announcement of live sets in Japan and Australia, including their first ever performance in Tasmania at the Dark Mofo Festival.

In November 2018, Richard Devine joined the user chat room of the electronic music forum We Are The Music Makers and hinted at an easter egg on the AE_STORE website. Following a partially hidden link, the user could download instrument parameter files for Elektron's hardware which Autechre used for the 2008 Quaristice tour. When loaded into a Monomachine or Machinedrum these files allowed the user to create their own Quaristice tour soundboard.

SIGN and PLUS (2020–present)
On 1 September 2020 Warp Records announced that fans should sign up to the Autechre mailing list. The following day Autechre announced their next album SIGN, which was released on 16 October 2020.

In 2020 interviews, the duo stated that they started recording material for SIGN from the summer of 2018, after their Australian tour, up to February that year. Booth remarked that the songs were more emotional than other works, and that this was the first album recorded off their revamped systems.

Another album titled PLUS was surprise released digitally on 28 October, with physical and streaming releases planned on 20 November.

Influences
A wide variety of influences have been noted as discernible in Autechre's music. The duo's roots in tagging, early hip-hop and electro music, and b-boy culture in general are still evident, with many reviews noting hip-hop rhythms—sometimes heavily obscured or processed, and sometimes explicit even in later work. All of Autechre's live webcasts have featured large amounts of early hip-hop and electro. In a review of Oversteps, The Wire noted "Treale" as being "a reminder of Booth and Brown's musical apprenticeship as teenage B-boys". As Autechre's music and studio setup evolved, reviews started to note influences from farther afield; experiments in and generative synthesis, musique concrète, and FM synthesis drew comparisons with Iannis Xenakis, Karlheinz Stockhausen and Bernard Parmegiani from critics such as Paul Morley. The group have mentioned musique concrète composers Tod Dockstader and Edgard Varèse as influences. Autechre also cite Coil as a major influence, with an unfinished collaboration of unknown completeness occurring around the release of LP5 and EP7. Chris Richards of The Washington Post stated in 2015 that Autechre create "some of the most complicated music you could ever hope to drown in" and are "recognized as pioneers in experimental music". Autechre’s work has been described as “music that sounds like it designed itself, with audio fractals that change constantly like living organisms.”

Recording
Booth and Brown record tracks collaboratively, but in separate studios with identical software and equipment. The process, as Booth describes in a 2020 interview with the New York Times, involves one sending a track to another, which is sent back with revisions before it is deemed finished. Brown remarks that, although they "behave differently, we sometimes try to achieve the same goal, but with greatly differing approaches (as) we really do get off on the fact that we’re on the same page most of the time.”

Equipment 
Autechre use many different digital synths and a few analogue synths in their production, as well as analogue and digital drum machines, mixers, effects units and samplers. They have also made extensive use of a variety of computer based sequencers, software synthesisers, and other applications as a means of controlling those synths and processing the synthesised sounds. Much of the hardware and software they use has been customised by the band themselves. Autechre have also experimented in depth with development environments such as Max/MSP, and Kyma, amongst others, from 1997 onwards. From 2005 until 2009, they have used the Elektron Machinedrum and Monomachine, alongside Akai MPC and Nord Modular in their live performances. It has also been rumoured that Autechre have used military equipment in their work. In 2008, Sean Booth reported that if he were locked in a cell for a year with only one piece of software and one piece of hardware, he'd "probably take a copy of Digital Performer and an AKG C1000 microphone."

Other machines that Autechre have repeatedly mentioned in interviews are appreciated for their interface and aesthetics as much as their sound, including the Roland TR-606 and MC-202, and the Nord Lead. According to the 2016 interview to Resident Advisor, both members haven't bought a piece of equipment "in the last 5 years", making MAX/MSP a primary production method, with Sean Booth stating that "in Max I can generally build the thing I need, and if I don't know how to do that it'll generally be worthwhile learning." Booth said that they use MAX as MIDI "only handles a limited set of information" and that instruments like the piano "separates the artist from the string."

Collaborations, remixes and covers
Both Booth and Brown are known to have been heavily involved with the majority of releases by the mysterious Gescom collective, although Booth admitted in an interview that around 20-30 musicians overall are connected with what he describes as an "umbrella project". Three elaborately packaged albums (æ³o & h³æ, æo³ & ³hæ, and ha³oe & ah³eo) have been made by Autechre in collaboration with Andrew M. McKenzie's ongoing Hafler Trio project. These albums are significantly more minimal than any other Autechre release, featuring dense, claustrophobic and noisy drones. A track called "Elephant Gear", credited to both Autechre and Canadian breakcore musician Venetian Snares under the alias AEVSVS, was released on a compilation in tribute to Elektron co-founder Daniel Hansson, who died in a car accident. Autechre have collaborated with several artists for live performances, including Zoviet France, Fennesz and Roedelius 3. Telepathics Meh In-Sect Connection, an album by Sean Booth in collaboration with Mika Vainio of Pan Sonic and Kouhei Matsunaga, was released in early 2010.

In 2009 they contributed a cover of an LFO song to the Warp20 compilation, as well as having their song "Tilapia" covered by John Callaghan.

The compilation CD The Only Blip Hop Record You Will Ever Need, Vol.1, issued in 2002 by David Byrne's Luaka Bop Records, contains a cover version of "Gnit" performed by Marie + Scratch.  It is performed using only human voice samples.

The band Pink Freud has performed covers of several Autechre numbers, including Basscadet, Cichli, and Bike.  These live performances are available on YouTube.

Autechre helped initiate the All Tomorrow's Parties music festival in 2000, and curated the 2003 festival.

Radio
Autechre have been involved with radio since their early days, originally spinning for IBC Radio, a Manchester pirate radio station in 1991, where they had their own show playing Belgian techno alongside their own demos. Later they would appear as part of Gescom for their weekly "Disengage" show on Manchester's Kiss FM.

Webcasts
Autechre have streamed exceptionally long live DJ mixes as webcasts to coincide with the release of four albums so far:
 A nearly nine-hour live mix on 1011 April 2005 (GMT) to coincide with the release of Untilted.
 A twelve-hour live stream on 2324 February 2008 to coincide with the release of Quaristice.
 A twelve-and-a-half-hour live stream spanning 6pm6:30am (GMT) on 23 March 2010 to coincide with the release of Oversteps.
 Two separate ten-hour live streams from 8pm to 6am (GMT) on 2 and 3 March 2013 to coincide with the release of Exai.
 A 12-hour mix via radio streaming platform Mixlr on 13 October 2019.
 On October 8, SIGN was broadcast on the Autechre website.
 A 5.5 hour long mix on Mixlr was streamed on 30 December 2022.

Discography

 Incunabula (1993)
 Amber (1994)
 Tri Repetae (1995)
 Chiastic Slide (1997)
 LP5 (1998)
 Confield (2001)
 Draft 7.30 (2003)
 Untilted (2005)
 Quaristice (2008)
 Oversteps (2010)
 Exai (2013)
 elseq 1–5 (2016)
 NTS Sessions 1–4 (2018)
 SIGN (2020)
 PLUS'' (2020)

References

External links
  – official site

Mainstream references
 
 
 
 
 
 Autechre at Warp Records

Interviews and other
 Autechre TV Interview on MTV Europe's Party Zone (September 1994)
 Sean Booth Interview with Disquiet (November 1997)
 Autechre interview with Sound on Sound (April 2004)
 Rob Brown interview with BBC Collective (April 2005)
 Sean Booth interview with KultureFlash (April 2005)
 Sean Booth interview with Cyclic Defrost (May 2005)
 Rob Brown Interview about Quaristice with Barcode Magazine (January 2008)
 Interview with Sean Booth in The List
 Autechre, "Oversteps" by Billboard
 Sean Booth Interview with Fail (April 2010)

English electronic music duos
Intelligent dance musicians
Warp (record label) artists
TVT Records artists
Nothing Records artists
Musical groups from Greater Manchester
Music in the Metropolitan Borough of Rochdale
English experimental musical groups
Musical groups established in 1987
English techno music groups